Klimek is a Czech, Polish, Slovak and Sorbian surname. Notable people with the surname include:
 Alf Klimek (born 1956), Australian musician
 Antonín Klimek (1937–2005), Czech historian
 Arkadiusz Klimek (born 1975), Polish footballer
 István Klimek (1913–1988), Hungarian-Romanian footballer
 Jan Klimek (born 1953), Polish politician
 Jayney Klimek (born 1962), Australian singer
 Johnny Klimek (born 1962), Australian film composer
 Lukáš Klimek (born 1986), Czech ice hockey player
 Lylian Klimek (born 1942), Canadian artist and educator 
 Małgorzata Klimek (born 1957), Polish mathematician
 Mieczysław Klimek (1913–1955), Polish engineer, professor and rector 
 Octavio Klimek Alcaraz (born 1962), Mexican politician
 Sabine Klimek (born 1991), Romanian handballer 
 Teresa Klimek (1929–2013), Polish educator and activist
 Tillie Klimek (1876–1936), Polish-born American serial killer
 Tony Klimek (1925–2012), American football defensive end player

See also 
 Klimeck
 Klimmek

Czech-language surnames
Polish-language surnames